Long May You Run, J. Tillman is J. Tillman's third album. It was originally released in limited edition of 150 copies through Keep Recordings. In 2007 it was re-released together with I Will Return on Fargo Records as a double-CD.

Track listing

References

External links
J. Tillman official website

2006 albums
Keep Recordings albums
Josh Tillman albums